Anomis fulvida is a moth of the family Erebidae first described by Achille Guenée in 1852. It is found in Australia, African countries like Sierra Leone, South Africa, Tanzania, and Asian countries like Sri Lanka.

Biology
Caterpillars are known to feed on Abutilon, Alcea rosea, Bombax, Gossypium, Hibiscus, Citrus, Sida and Urena lobata. It is a major pest of cotton in Australia.

Subspecies
Two subspecies are found including the nominate subspecies.
Anomis fulvida fulvida Guenée, 1852
Anomis fulvida griseolineata Warren, 1913

References

Moths of Asia
Moths described in 1852